Rhacodactylus trachycephalus, commonly known as the lesser rough-snouted giant gecko, dwarf rough-snouted giant gecko, or tough-snouted giant gecko, is a species of gecko endemic to two small areas of islands in New Caledonia. Rhacodactylus trachyrhynchus is a closely related species, but R. trachycephalus is smaller and has a number of other noticeable differences. R. trachycephalus is viviparous, giving birth to only one or two young a year. Its restricted humid forest habitat is vulnerable due to multiple threats. As a result of habitat reduction, low reproduction rate and small population, it is one of the rarest geckos in the world.

Description 
The species' scales create a mosaic pattern, with patches of white, brown, grey, and green in various hues. Its toes are somewhat broad and it has a tail exhibiting prehensility.

R. trachycephalus is closely related to Rhacodactylus trachyrhynchus, but has a number of noticeable differences. In particular, R. trachycephalus'''s body size is smaller than that of R. trachyrhynchus and it has larger eyes. In addition, R. trachycephalus has fewer scale rows on its midbody, as well as fewer scales in the area in between its eyes and nostrils; the scales that are in the eye-nostril area are also smaller than those on R. trachyrhynchus.

 Taxonomy Rhacodactylus trachycephalus was originally described by George Albert Boulenger in 1878. It was described as Chameleonurus trachycephalus the same year, also by Boulenger. In 2005, it was named as R. trachyrhynchus trachycephalus, a subspecies of Rhacodactylus trachyrhynchus, by Myers and again by Yuri Kaverkin in 2009. It was assigned to genus Rhacodactylus by Aaron M. Bauer in 2012, a treatment that produced the combination Rhacodactylus trachycephalus.

 Behavior R. trachycephalus is viviparous, with it and R. trachyrhynchus being the only two species in their genus to exhibit viviparity. Viviparity in geckos is exclusive to New Zealand. R. trachycephalus generally gives birth to no more than two young per year, which is a very low rate of reproduction and partially why the species is so rare. To maintain a high level of heat and humidity, a large number of R. trachyrhynchus individuals will sometimes collect close together in shelters, a characteristic that is also exhibited by Underwoodisaurus milii. R. trachyrnhynchus individuals sleep in tree holes with their family.

 Distribution and conservation R. trachycephalus is a rare species, living exclusively in New Caledonia. The species' range is extremely restricted; it only occurs on a small area of Isle of Pines and a small island off its shore, in humid forest habitats. The offshore island is small enough that its population could be completely destroyed in the event of a single disaster and both of these populations are extremely vulnerable.R. trachycephalus is listed as Critically Endangered on the IUCN Red List and Endemia.nc'', and it is protected in the Northern Province. The organism is threatened by illegal trade and fragmentation of habitat. Another factor is the infestation of the invasive little fire ant, which causes the offshore island populations to be especially at risk. It is also threatened by cats and rats, which prey on eggs, young, and adults; these invasive species, like the little fire ant, especially threaten the offshore island populations. These factors make it one of the most uncommon geckos alive currently, and possibly the rarest in the world.

References

Rhacodactylus
Reptiles described in 1878
Taxa named by George Albert Boulenger
Geckos of New Caledonia
Endemic fauna of New Caledonia